FIH Erhvervsbank A/S (hereafter FIH) is the sixth-largest bank in Denmark in terms of total assets. FIH is an integrated corporate and investment bank, offering selected services within capital and advisory services to Danish corporates and operates internationally under the name “Finance for Danish Industry”. FIH is headquartered in Copenhagen and operates from four local offices in Jutland (Aalborg, Århus, Herning, and Fredericia). Year-end 2010, FIH had a total lending of approximately DKK [60] billion (approx. EUR [8] billion) spread on roughly 4.000 corporate clients.

FIH is owned by a consortium mainly composed of Scandinavian pension funds, with Danish pension funds ATP and PFA ultimately holding 49.95% and 19.98%, respectively and the remainder being held by Swedish insurance company Folksam (19.98%) and independent financial advisory firm C.P.Dyvig & Co (9.99%)

History 
FIH was founded in 1958 by initiative from the Danish Government to provide medium and long term capital for the Danish industry. In the beginning, FIH was owned by the Danish Central Bank, selected domestic banks, insurance companies, and the Confederation of Danish Industries.

In 1988, FIH was listed on the Copenhagen stock exchange and in 1989, FIH was assigned its first credit rating by Moody's Investors Service. In 1999, FI Holding A/S purchased FIH. FI Holding was established at this point – with the majority shareholder Swedbank owning 60 per cent of shares.

In June 2004, Kaupthing Bank hf Iceland bought 100 per cent of the shares in FI Holding A/S for a net price of EUR 950 million and on September 29, 2004, the acquisition of FIH was approved by the Icelandic and Danish Financial Supervisory Authorities.
During the period of the Icelandic ownership, FIH made a strategic expansion from its traditional corporate lending business into investment banking activities and to this end established two new business units: Capital Markets and Corporate Finance. Furthermore, in 2008, FIH established NETBANK PRO, a Web-based retail savings platform.

As a result of Kaupthing going into receivership in October 2008, the FIH shares owned by Kaupthing FIH were pledged as collateral with the Icelandic central bank. Being ringfenced from Kaupthing by Danish regulation, FIH continued to operate as a Danish stand-alone bank. Since October 2008, the Icelandic owners had been attempting to sell FIH, which materialised on September 19, 2010 when the consortium composed of ATP, PFA, Folksam and CPDyvig announced that it had agreed to purchase FIH. Completion of the acquisition took place on January 6, 2011.

Managing directors 
 1958-1981 Erik Mollerup
 1981-1992 Olav Grue
 1992-1998 Henrik Heideby
 1998-2009 Lars Johansen
 2009-2011 Henrik Sjøgren
 2011-2014 Henrik Sjøgreen (Co-CEO), Bjarne Graven Larsen (Co-CEO)
 2014-     Henrik Sjøgreen

Brief Facts 
 Net Profit, 2010: DKK 524,6 million
 Employees (FTEs per 30 December 2010): 356,24
 Total Assets (2010): DKK 109,338 million
 Moody's Rating (per 7. oktober 2011): E+ (financial strength)

External links 
 FIH website
 FIH .com website
 FIH Partners website
 PFA
 Folksam

Banks of Denmark
Financial services companies based in Copenhagen
Danish companies established in 1958